Manor Park is a residential area of the London Borough of Newham in east London, England. The area is bordered by Ilford to the east, Forest Gate to the west, Wanstead to the north, and East Ham to the south.

It was originally a part of the hundred of Becontree, and part of the historic county of Essex. Since 1965, Manor Park has been part of the London Borough of Newham, a local government district of Greater London.  The area forms the majority of the London E12 postcode district.

History 
The area known as Manor Park is not formally defined, but is more or less coterminous with the Ancient Parish of Little Ilford. Romford Road, the Roman Road from Aldgate to Colchester, is the main east–west route through the area. This well-established coaching route linking the city with the towns of Essex was, from 1721, maintained by the Middlesex and Essex turnpike trust. The principal local road ran south from the Romford Road and the northern end was known in the 18th century and later as White Post Lane (now known as High Street North), from a post standing at its junction with Romford Road. The 'White Post' appears to have stood on the site of the Earl of Essex Public House. A hamlet known as North End was located amongst fields that dominated this area.

By the middle of the next century the rural scene had begun to change as the railways started to spread outwards from London, followed by the development of estates of suburban houses. There were three railway stations close by - Forest Gate which first opened in 1840; Manor Park which opened in 1873 and Woodgrange Park which opened in 1894. Tramways operated along the Romford Road.

The beginnings of development along the south of Romford Road took place in 1867, especially close to the junction of High Street North and the site of the future Earl of Essex public house. Behind terraces of workers' houses was an animal charcoal works, an unpleasant and noxious manufacturing process involving the carcasses of dead horses. Animal charcoal was used as a filter, particularly in the sugar industry. As the area became more built up such trades disappeared and the charcoal works had gone by the 1890s, replaced by a Board School (Salisbury junior mixed and infants) which opened in 1893.

Apart from four pairs of small semi-detached agricultural workers' houses known as Ebor Cottages, the area to the north of Romford Road was ripe for development and the owners, the Gurney family, sold 110 acres of market garden land to Thomas Corbett in 1877. The Corbett family built the Woodgrange and Durham Road estates between 1877 and 1892. The Forest Gate Weekly recorded the attractiveness of the estate, it having 'the three great essentials to the average city man of easy access, reasonable rentals and a first class local market.'

By the 1890s Forest Gate was an upmarket suburb for the aspiring middle class commuter, who could use the Eastern Counties Railway from Manor Park to travel to the city. The area around the junction of Manor Park and White Post Lane (later High Street North) became an important shopping and provisioning area for nearby residents who populated the new streets in the area. In 1898 1,129 houses, accommodating about 6000 inhabitants were built in Little Ilford on the site of the old Manor Farm.

Geography
Manor Park was part of the County Borough of East Ham, Essex, until 1965, when the Greater London county was formed.

Transport
Romford Road, a stretch of the A118, runs for much of its length in both Newham and Redbridge, providing the main road route through Manor Park and linking the eastern districts with the city of London.

The main public transport link is the Elizabeth line, which you can catch at Manor Park railway station. Trains to Liverpool Street station run every ten minutes. Nearby Woodgrange Park station is on the Barking to Gospel Oak line, popularly referred to at the Goblin, which is part of the London Overground network. Both stations are in Zone 3.

Durham Road Conservation Zone
The Durham Road Conservation Zone is a small late-Victorian development, built close to Manor Park station. It was designated a Conservation Area in 1984 to retain its original charm and character. Additional planning controls were introduced in 1998 to protect and enhance its special character. The area, popularly referred to as Manor Park Village, was originally developed in the 1880s on farmland that formed part of the Gurney estate. It was built by one builder to an overall plan, with a limited range of house styles giving the area a distinctive character and unity. The developers, the Corbett family, built several suburban estates including the adjacent Woodgrange Estate in Forest Gate.

Open Spaces
Manor Park's Itchycoo Park (officially Little Ilford Park) was made famous in a song by the Small Faces, whose lead singer Steve Marriott lived in the area.

Education

Manor Park is home to many primary schools, with Salisbury primary school, which opened in 1893, being accessible by the main Romford Road or High Street North.

Community resources
A number of council-run, charity-supported and independent community centres and education initiatives are active in the area:
 The Froud Centre
 Hathaway Community Centre (now closed)
 Jack Cornwell Community Centre
 London Tamil Sangam
 Manor Park Community Centre
 Manor Park Library
 Trinity Community Centre

Sport
Manor Park also has an amateur football team called A.C. Manor Park playing in the AFL.

Notable people associated with Manor Park

Michael Blaney, World War II bomb disposal officer from Newry; died when a bomb he was trying to defuse exploded in Manor Park; Blaney Cresecent in East Ham is named after him; awarded the George Cross
Clive Burr, drummer with Iron Maiden, grew up in Manor Park
Jack Cornwell, teenage recipient of the Victoria Cross, grew up in Manor Park and is buried at the Manor Park Cemetery
Greer Garson, Oscar-winning film actress, born in Manor Park in 1904
Bobby George, darts player and pundit. Born in Manor Park, 1945.
Jimmy Greaves, footballer, born Manor Park in 1940.
Stanley Holloway, actor, born at 25 Albany Road (at which there is an English Heritage blue plaque erected in 2009)
Steve Marriott, lead singer and guitarist of Small Faces and Humble Pie, was born in Manor Park
Kele Okereke, lead singer of Bloc Party, is from Manor Park
Matt Taylor, space scientist, who landed the Rosetta spacecraft on a comet. Born in Manor Park, 1973.

References

External links
 The Newham Story
 The Newham Story Forum
 The Techshop, StudioE12 and TradeSkills E12 homepages
 Manor Park Village Community Website

Manor Park, London
Areas of London
Stratford, London